James Alexander (born December 17, 1948) is an American soul and R&B musician.  He is a longtime member of the band the Bar-Kays, for which he plays bass guitar.

Early life and family 
Alexander was born at McLemore Clinic in Memphis, Tennessee. In a 2014 interview, he stated that the clinic was across the street from Stax Records' headquarters, and that he grew up about a block away from Stax. Alexander attended Booker T. Washington High School in Memphis.

He is the father of noted hip-hop and R&B producer Phalon "Jazze Pha" Alexander, whom he named after his best friend and late Bar-Kays bandmate Phalon Jones.  Contrary to widespread belief, James Alexander's relationship, which produced his son Phalon, was not with R&B and gospel singer Deniece "Niecy" Williams, but rather with another woman (herself an experienced singer) named Denise Williams.

Career 
James Alexander was the bassist for the Bar-Kays when four of the six band members, including Jones, were killed in the same plane crash that claimed the life of soul singer Otis Redding.  Alexander was the only Bar-Kays member not aboard that flight. According to a 2014 news article, before the plane departed, Alexander volunteered to return the band's rental car and take a commercial flight to the band's next engagement. Other accounts state that the plane, a Beechcraft owned by Redding, only held eight occupants (Redding, five of the Bar-Kays, the pilot and Redding's road manager), and that it was Alexander's turn in the rotation to board a commercial flight to the next destination.  Alexander had the task of identifying the bodies of his bandmates, as well as that of Redding.

After the crash, Ben Cauley, the sole survivor among those who were aboard the plane, worked with Alexander to reform the band. Subsequent work included the soundtrack recording of the Academy Award-winning theme song from the 1971 feature film Shaft, on which Alexander played bass guitar. As of 2018, Alexander was the only original member performing in the still-active Bar-Kays.

References

1949 births
Living people
African-American guitarists
American funk bass guitarists
American male bass guitarists
Musicians from Memphis, Tennessee
The Bar-Kays members
Guitarists from Tennessee
20th-century American bass guitarists
20th-century American male musicians
20th-century African-American musicians